Pomerene may refer to:

People 
 Atlee Pomerene (1863–1937), American politician
 James H. Pomerene (1920–2008), American engineer

Place names 
 Pomerene, Arizona

Other uses 
 Pomerene Elementary School District
 Pomerene House
 Webb–Pomerene Act

See also 
 Pomer (disambiguation)